Surya Tirkey (born 28 July 1998) is an Indian professional footballer who plays as a midfielder for Indian Arrows in the I-League.

Career 
Surya piled his trade with FC Pune City Reserves and Academy, Surya is also a 2013 SAFF U-16 champion. Besides, playing for AIFF Elite Academy, he also made an appearance in the 2016 IFA Shield final, and in the same year, he managed to lift the U-18 I-League honour. Furthermore, only the following year, 2017, he lifted the IFA Shield with FC Pune City.

He made his professional debut for the Indian Arrows side against Punjab F.C. on 16 December 2019, He was brought in the 89th minutes as Indian Arrows lost 1–0.

Career statistics

References

1998 births
Living people
People from Jharkhand
Indian footballers
Indian Arrows players
Footballers from Jharkhand
I-League players
India youth international footballers
Association football midfielders